Maryam Pirband is an Iranian-American filmmaker, director, screenwriter, actress, and a judge in international film festivals. Some of her short film have been selected by notable international festivals, such as the Cannes Film Festival and the Dhaka International Film Festival. She is best known for winning the "Best Female Director Award" at Action On Film International Film Festival for Silence in 2017. Pirband is the only Iranian official member of Alliance of Women Directors, and has participated in many film festivals as a jury member and head of jury. She's also known for Dance with Me (2012), Hanaii (2012), and Fermysk (2017).

Early life
Pirband was born in Tehran. She is graduated in Master in screenwriting from Azusa Pacific University, Movie Directing from Society of Iranian Youth Film Makers. She also has a B.A in Economics from Tehran university.
Due to her interest in cinema, Pirband left her job at Iran Air and began her acting career in 2005.

Career
Pirband began her professional activities in the movie industry as an assistant and script supervisor. In 2006, she began taking roles as a stunt performer after meeting Peyman Abadi. After being stunt roles, Pirband began working on producing and directing films, and made her first short film in the action genre. Prior to her directing career, Pirband enjoyed acting roles in 22 films, television series and theater productions . P6 marked her debut as a director. She directed, wrote and produced 18 short films which have been submitted to international film festivals. Dance with Me was her first film to make its way to a notable international film festival at the Cannes. Slemani International Film Festival in Iraq marked her debut as an international judge. Pirband has won two international best female director awards to date, for Silence (2014) and Fermysk (2017).

Filmography

Notable works

Silence
This short film was directed and written by Maryam Pirpand. It was nominated in 6 national and international film festivals. She won ″Best Female Director Award″ at Action On Film International Film Festival for Directing.

Dance with me
This short film also was directed and written by Maryam Pirpand. It was nominated in 8 national and international film festivals such as 2012 Cannes Film Festival and Duhok International Film Festival.

References

External links

Year of birth missing (living people)
Living people
Iranian screenwriters
Persian-language film directors
People from Tehran
Iranian women film directors
Women screenwriters
Iranian documentary film directors
Women documentary filmmakers